The 2014 Vrancea earthquake struck Vrancea County on 22 November 2014 at , with a moment magnitude of 5.7. The earthquake occurred at a depth of 39 kilometers and lasted for thirty seconds. On the Mercalli scale the quake registered an intensity of VI (Strong).

The earthquake was felt in northern Bulgaria and the Moldovan city of Chișinău. Towns located near the epicenter include: Mărășești (6 kilometers), Tecuci (22 kilometers), Focșani (21 kilometers), Adjud (25 kilometers) and Onești (51 kilometers).
Mircea Radulian, the leader of Institutul Național de Cercetare-Dezvoltare pentru Fizica Pământului, reported that in Galați and Focșani, towns nearer the epicenter, moment magnitude measured over 6.0.

Damage 
Shortly after the earthquake, Mobile Telephone network services were disrupted. The frontage of an old building in Tulcea was damaged, and a radiator installed in a sixth-floor apartment fell and injured the owner.

Four communes in Vrancea County lost electrical power. In Focșani, a portion of a roof collapsed, and a road cracked.

Residents of northern Galați County were affected by electrical outages and water shortages.

Aftershocks 
A list of aftershocks is included below.

References 

2014 earthquakes
2014 in Bulgaria
2014 in Moldova
2014 in Ukraine
November 2014 events in Romania
November 2014 events in Ukraine
November 2014 events in Europe
Earthquakes in Bulgaria
Earthquakes in Moldova
Earthquakes in Ukraine
Earthquakes in Romania
2014 disasters in Europe